is a Japanese manga artist. Her works include Power!!, published in North America as Girl Got Game, and Love Attack!.

Bibliography
 (1997) 
 (1998) 
 (1999) 
 (1999–2002) Power!!; English translation: Girl Got Game
 (2003) Heaven!!
 (2004) Girl Got Game 2
 (2005–Present) ; English translation: Love Attack!
 (2011–Present) "RabuKatsu!"; English translation: Love Win!
(2013–Present) seishun otome banchou

References

External links
 Official website 
 

Living people
Manga artists
1976 births